Baluchabad (also Romanized as Balūchābād; also known as Naẓarābād) is a village in Qoroq Rural District, Baharan District, Gorgan County, Golestan Province, Iran. At the 2006 census, its population was 105, in 24 families.

References 

Populated places in Gorgan County